Tenney Frank (May 19, 1876 – April 3, 1939) was a prominent American ancient historian and classical scholar. He studied many aspects of Ancient Rome, for instance its economy, imperialism, demographics and epigraphy.

Biography
Tenney Frank earned his A.B. at the University of Kansas in 1898 and A.M. the following year.  Frank went on to receive his Ph.D. at the University of Chicago in 1903.  Frank taught at Bryn Mawr College as Professor of Latin from 1904 until 1919, when he moved to the Johns Hopkins University.  At Bryn Mawr Frank wrote and published his influential study Roman Imperialism in 1914.  Frank believed that Rome's imperialism stemmed from a desire to keep peace in the Mediterranean world by preventing the rise of any rival power. Frank's other work focused on classical literature, with articles on Cicero, Strabo, Curiatius Maternus, Plautus, and Virgil, among others. In 1932 he gave the British Academy's Master-Mind Lecture, on Cicero.

He wrote periodically for the American Historical Review, including a paper on the demise of the various ancient Italian peoples that comprised the Roman ethnicity in Julius Caesar's day. Arguing that Roman expansion brought in masses of foreign peoples and slaves that over time changed the ethnic make-up of the Roman populace and contributed to the empire's ruin.

He worked on Latin inscriptions, including the stele from the Forum Romanum in Rome, and on Roman construction and the Servian Wall of Rome.  His work on the Roman economy was a seminal study of the economy and trade in the Roman world.

He married Grace Edith Mayer in 1907. Of Swedish ancestry, Frank was influenced by his agrarian roots.  He was also multilingual and had a great facility for languages, including Scandinavian tongues.  At Johns Hopkins, Frank trained Thomas Robert Shannon Broughton, with whom he collaborated on his studies of the Roman economy.  A bibliography of Frank's work may be found in The American Journal of Philology 60.3 (1939).

He is buried in Wolvercote Cemetery, Oxford, England.

Works

 (1903). A Stichometric Scholium to the Medea of Euripides, The University of Chicago Press.
 (1904). Attraction of Mood in Early Latin: A Dissertation, Press of the New Era Printing Company.
 (1920). An Economic History of Rome to the End of the Republic, Johns Hopkins University Press [rev. ed. 1927].
 (1922). Vergil, a Biography, Henry Holt & Company [Russell & Russell, 1965].
 (1923). A History of Rome, Henry Holt & Company.
 (1924). "Latin Quantitative Speech as Affected by Immigration". The American Journal of Philology, Vol. 45, No. 2 (1924), pp. 161–175.
 (1924). Roman Buildings of the Republic, American Academy in Rome.
 (1928). Catullus and Horace, Henry Holt & Company [Russell & Russell, 1965].
 (1930). Life and Literature in the Roman Republic, Sather Classical Lectures, University of California Press, Sixth Printing, 1971.
 (1932). Aspects of Social Behavior in Ancient Rome, Harvard University Press [Cooper Square Publishers, 1969].
 (1933 & 1940). An Economic Survey of Ancient Rome, Johns Hopkins University Press.
 Vol. I: Rome and Italy of the Republic.
 Vol. V: Rome and Italy of the Empire.

Other

References

Necrology
 DeWitt, Norman W. (1939). "Tenney Frank", The American Journal of Philology, 60(3), pp. 273–287.
 Pease, Arthur Stanley (1940). "Tenney Frank (1876-1939)," Proceedings of the American Academy of Arts and Sciences, Vol. 74, No. 6. 
 Taylor, Lily Ross (1939). "In Memoriam: Tenney Frank," Bryn Mawr Alumnæ Bulletin, Vol. XIX, No. 1.

Further reading
 Baynes, Norman H. (1943). "The Decline of the Roman Power in Western Europe. Some Modern Explanations," Journal of Roman Studies, Vol. XXXIII. 
 Broughton, T. R. S. (1990). “Tenney Frank.” In Ward W. Briggs and William M. Calder III, (eds.), Classical Scholarship. A Biographical Encyclopedia, Garland Publishing, pp., 68–76.
 Muller, Herbert Joseph (1952). The Uses of the Past, New American Library.

External links

 Tenney Frank at Database of Classical Scholars 
 
 
 Works by Tenney Frank, at Hathi Trust
 Works by Tenney Frank, at JSTOR
 Professor Tenney Frank on Agriculture in Early Latium
 The Columna Rostrata of C. Duilius
 Bryn Mawr: History of the Latin Department
 Bryn Mawr: Notable Former Faculty
 Antiquary's Shoebox at LacusCurtius: several journal articles by Tenney Frank

American historians
American classical scholars
1876 births
1939 deaths
People from Clay Center, Kansas
Classical scholars of Bryn Mawr College
Classical scholars of Johns Hopkins University
Scholars of Latin literature
American people of Swedish descent
Bryn Mawr College faculty
Corresponding Fellows of the British Academy